Maredudd ab Owain ab Edwin (died 1072) was a prince of the kingdom of Deheubarth in south west Wales.

Maredudd was the son of Owain ab Edwin and was hence the male-line heir of Hywel Dda. The throne had been seized from the previous king of this line - Hywel ab Edwin - by Gruffydd ap Llywelyn, who claimed the throne through his mother, Angharad. Angharad was the daughter of Maredudd ab Owain ap Hywel, while Hywel claimed the throne through the latter Maredudd's younger brother, Einion (Hywel's grandfather).

Gruffydd had united almost all Wales under his rule, and was the only ruler to be King of Wales, but on Gruffydd's death in 1063 Maredudd reclaimed Deheubarth for his line.

During Maredudd's reign the Normans sacked south-east Wales in response to Welsh support for Saxon revolts like that of Eadric the Wild. After a few attempts to halt this, Maredydd decided not to resist the Norman encroachment on Gwent and was rewarded with lands in England in 1070. In 1072 he was killed in a battle by the river Rhymni. He was succeeded by his brother, Rhys ab Owain, rather than his young son, Gruffydd ap Maredudd.

When Rhys ab Owain died, the realm was seized by Rhys ap Tewdwr (Maredudd's second cousin, descended from a younger son of Einion). Gruffydd lived on his father's lands in England for some years during this period, before being killed when trying to recapture his father's kingdom from Rhys ap Tewdwr.

References 
John Edward Lloyd (1911) A history of Wales from the earliest times to the Edwardian conquest (Longmans, Green & Co.)

House of Dinefwr
1072 deaths
Monarchs of Deheubarth
Medieval Welsh killed in battle
11th-century Welsh monarchs
Year of birth unknown
Monarchs killed in action